Grießkogel or Grieskogel is the name of the following mountains in Austria:

 Breiter Grießkogel (3,287 m0, near Längenfeld in the Stubai Alps
 Grießkogel (Glockner Group) (3,066 m), in the Glockner Group of the High Tauern
 Grießkogel (Steinernes Meer) (2,543 m), in the Steinernes Meer
 Grießkogel (Tennen) (2,270 m), in the Tennen Mountains
 Kühtaier Grießkogel (Hinterer 2,673 m and Vorderer 2,666 m), near Kühtai in the Sellrain Mountains (Ötztal Alps) 
 Praxmarer Grieskogel (2,711 m), near Praxmar in the Sellrain in the  Stubai Alps
 Rietzer Grießkogel (2,884 m), above Telfs and Kühtai in the Sellrain Mountains (Ötztal Alps) 
 Söldner Grieskogel (2,911 m), on the Geigenkamm ridge of the Ötztal Alps